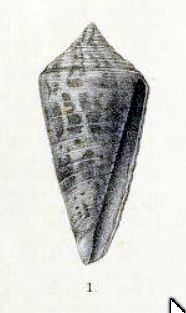
- Original image of a shell of Conus adenensis

Scientific classification
- Domain: Eukaryota
- Kingdom: Animalia
- Phylum: Mollusca
- Class: Gastropoda
- Subclass: Caenogastropoda
- Order: Neogastropoda
- Superfamily: Conoidea
- Family: Conidae
- Genus: Conus
- Species: C. adenensis

Binomial name
- Conus adenensis E. A. Smith, 1891

Synonyms
- Graphiconus adenensis E. A. Smith, 1891; Phasmoconus (Graphiconus) adenensis (E. A. Smith, 1891)

= Conus adenensis =

Species of sea snail

Conus adenensis is a species of sea snail, a marine gastropod mollusk, in the family Conidae, the cone snails and their allies.
